Gaisberg (Heidelberg) is a mountain of Baden-Württemberg, Germany. In the 17th century, Matthäus Merian (1593–1650) depicted the Gaisberg as almost completely treeless. Today it is mostly covered in dense deciduous forest and rises above the western part of Heidelberg's old town and the adjoining western town on the edge of the Upper Rhine plain.

Gallery 

Mountains and hills of Baden-Württemberg